Michel Duboille (1924–2020) was a French slalom canoeist.

Career
Duboille competed in the late 1940s. He won two gold medals at the 1949 ICF Canoe Slalom World Championships in Geneva, earning them in the C-2 event and the C-2 team event.

References

1924 births
2020 deaths
French male canoeists
Medalists at the ICF Canoe Slalom World Championships
People from Saint-Ouen-sur-Seine